Octagon houses were a unique house style briefly popular in the 1850s in the United States and Canada. They are characterised by an octagonal (eight-sided) plan, and often feature a flat roof and a veranda all round. Their unusual shape and appearance, quite different from the ornate pitched-roof houses typical of the period, can generally be traced to the influence of one man, amateur architect and lifestyle pundit Orson Squire Fowler. Although there are other octagonal houses worldwide, the term octagon house usually refers specifically to octagonal houses built in North America during this period, and up to the early 1900s.

History
Early examples, before Fowler:
Poplar Forest, Thomas Jefferson's private retreat and plantation house near Lynchburg, Virginia.
William Thornton's John Tayloe III House, more commonly called The Octagon House in Washington, D.C. After the White House was burned by the British during the War of 1812, President James Madison stayed in the Octagon House, and it was here that the Treaty of Ghent (ending the War of 1812) was signed. It is now the headquarters of the American Institute of Architects. While known as "The Octagon", it is worth noting that this particular building is not actually octagonal.

Both houses are large brick buildings in the classical tradition. They may be seen as precursors, but are somewhat different from the Victorian octagon houses which are essentially domestic structures.

Orson Squire Fowler
The leading proponent of octagonal houses was Orson Squire Fowler. Fowler was America's foremost lecturer and writer on phrenology, the pseudoscience of defining an individual's characteristics by the contours of the skull. In the middle of the 19th century, Fowler made his mark on American architecture when he touted the advantages of octagonal homes over rectangular and square structures in his widely publicized book, The Octagon House: A Home For All, or A New, Cheap, Convenient, and Superior Mode of Building, printed in the year 1848. As a result of this popular and influential publication, a few thousand octagonal houses were erected in the United States, mostly in the Midwest, the East Coast and in nearby parts of Canada.

Fowler was not a professional architect.

Advantages of the octagon plan

According to Fowler, an octagon house was cheaper to build, allowed for additional living space, received more natural light, was easier to heat, and remained cooler in the summer. These benefits all derive from the geometry of an octagon: the shape encloses space efficiently, minimizing external surface area and consequently heat loss and gain, building costs etc. A circle is the most efficient shape, but difficult to build and awkward to furnish, so an octagon is a sensible approximation. Victorian builders were used to building 135° corners, as in the typical bay window, and could easily adapt to an octagonal plan.

Design principles
Fowler's The Octagon House is sometimes incorrectly referred to as a pattern book but the popularity of the book lies in the way Fowler suggested some general principles, and encouraged readers to invent the details for themselves. Only a few examples are offered, and apart from plans, the book has only two illustrations.

Fowler first shows some methods of subdividing an octagonal floor plan. Next is Howland's octagonal plan, a small house designed by 'Messrs. Morgan and Brothers, architects' which is similar to the Norrish House illustrated below. There follows A description of the author's own residence, now known as Fowler's Folly, at Fishkill, of which more below. Finally, A superior plan for a good sized house, which is a development of the Fishkill plans, apparently proposed by his engraver. The main feature of his plans is a desire to eliminate unnecessary circulation space, sometimes to the point that the main staircase is inconvenient, and the external veranda is the best way to get around the house.

Other design proposals include:
 Flat roof to collect rainwater, with cisterns built-in to collect and distribute the water.
 Rainwater filtering, using filter beds made up of alternating layers of sand and activated charcoal.
 Central heating by distributing hot air from a furnace in the basement.
 Flues, air ducts and speaking tubes built into the thickness of walls.

Built examples vary greatly in how much of this influence is apparent. Although built in brick, the Watertown house featured in this article is an almost perfect embodiment of many of Fowler's ideas.

Masswall construction
Stacked board construction was recommended in the first edition of A Home for All but the third edition of Fowler's book, printed in 1853, had a new subtitle: A Home For All, or The Gravel Wall and Octagon Mode of Building, and was distinguished by Fowler's enthusiasm for concrete construction. He appears to be unaware that concrete has been in use since the Romans, attributing the discovery to a Mr. Goodrich of Janesville, Wisconsin, and crediting himself with developing and popularizing the technique.  Fowler knew gravel and lime were available in unlimited quantities in the prairies and saw the "gravel wall" as offering a new, cheap and durable way of building. His house at Fishkill was built in concrete. The walls were built up a few feet at a time, by pouring a mixture of gravel and lime into timber shuttering. As the concrete cured, the shuttering could be taken down and moved up to the next level.

Modern concrete is made using Portland cement, not lime, but the main difference is the universal use of steel reinforcing bars, which greatly increase the strength of the material, and make it possible to build concrete beams and floor slabs as well as walls. Fowler used large stones to reinforce corners, but he used no other reinforcement, and was therefore restricted to walls. The roof, floors and verandas are all of timber construction.

Fowler's Folly
To quote Fowler "...those studies which have eventuated in this work were instituted primarily in order to erect this very house". Construction began in 1848, the same year his book was first published, and took five years to complete. Fowler removed the top of the hill to create a level site and to provide material for his "gravel walls". Fowler's favorite writing room was an internal room on the third floor, lit only from the cupola via a fanlight over the door. The house had no central staircase, so visitors entered one of the main rooms through a small lobby, while family and staff used the basement entrance. There are verandas all round the house at first-, second- and third-floor levels, linked by two outside stairs.

The financial panic of 1857 led Fowler to rent out the house, which subsequently went through a series of owners. Fowler's Folly fell into disrepair, and finally - condemned as a public hazard - it was dynamited in 1897 by Fred C. Haight, demolition engineer for the city of Fishkill.

Surviving examples
Estimates vary but hundreds of these Victorian-era homes are still standing across the United States and Canada.  One estimate puts the number at 2,077. Even in their heyday, octagon houses were never mainstream. 

The largest remaining octagon homes in the United States are Longwood in Natchez, Mississippi and the Octagon House in Watertown, Wisconsin. Both homes are open to the public. In Eastern Washington state one still sits where it was moved to in 1993 to Bridgeport, near the Columbia River.

Fowler was influential, but not the only proponent of octagonal houses and other structures. There are also octagonal barns, schoolhouses, churches, and in Canada, octagonal "dead houses".

Design and variations
Within the central idea of the octagonal plan, these houses show a wide variety of both construction and outward form. They range from the modest two-storey Bevis-Tucker House, to the grandiose Armour-Stiner House (both are illustrated below).

A full octagon house has eight equal sides, although slight variations in length are not unusual. In some cases the basic octagon is partially obscured by additions, either all round as at the Zelotes Holmes House, or by adding a functional wing out of sight at the rear. The House of the Seven Gables in Mayo, Florida has gables on seven sides while the eighth side is extended to the rear. 
The Richard Peacon House in Key West, Florida, appears to be a full octagon from the street but the rear portion is squared off.

Fowler advocated the use of "gravel wall" construction for the walls. This was an experimental technique at the time, and although some were built that way, most octagon houses were built the same way as ordinary houses, of timber frame, brick or stone.

Planned community 
A moral community headed by Henry S. Clubb tried to establish Octagon City in 1856 in Kansas.
It was intended to have an octagonal square with eight roads and octagonal farmhouses and barns.
Most settlers had left after the winter.

Examples of octagon houses
The following are examples of the 'true' octagon houses and the range of design variations to be found.

Case study: Watertown Octagon House, Wisconsin

Although one of the largest, the Watertown house is midway between the grandest and most modest surviving examples. It is well documented, has been carefully restored, and is open to the public as a museum.

History
Construction was completed 1854. The house fell into disuse and was taken over by the newly founded Watertown Historical Society, and opened to the public in 1938. It is still owned by the Society.

Construction and innovations
 The plan is a  octagon, with a  veranda all round at first- and second-floor levels.
 The central square is made up of two  leaves of brickwork with a  cavity, which is used for chimney flues and warm air ducting, to heat rooms without fireplaces. The double wall eliminates the need for projecting chimney breasts.
 The battlement effect at the top of the cupola is actually the four chimneys.
 A furnace in the basement heats water, and warm air is ducted into the twelve main rooms, i.e. those adjoining the central square.
 An elegant spiral staircase links all the floors. It is self-supporting on the inside and built into the walls on the outside of the stairwell. There is also a servants' staircase.
 The house has a flat roof, sloping gently towards the center.
 Rainwater from the roof was collected in a reservoir at third-floor level, and overflows into a cistern next to the kitchen in the basement.
 Publications regularly state the house has 57 rooms; however this includes every closet and passage. The number of habitable rooms is 29, including the octagonal room in the cupola.
 Despite having 15 bedrooms there is just a single bathroom.

Architectural style
The house was inspired by Fowler's book, and is a good example of his theories put into practice. Features which are directly linked to his ideas, apart from the octagonal plan, are the central spiral staircase, symmetrical arrangement of rooms with interconnecting doors, the verandas running all round the building, and the flat roof surmounted by a cupola. In accordance with Fowler's theories, the detailing is relatively plain for the period. Openings are simply framed by moldings. The covered verandas lack excess detail, having modest turned balustrade spindles and supporting posts. The decorative effect of the house comes from the basic design features: the octagonal shape and the external verandas.

There are four generously sized rooms on each floor, nearly 18 foot square, with connecting doors all round. The subsidiary rooms are less satisfactory, being triangular. The arrangement of rooms is rigidly the same on all floors because the partition walls are of  brickwork, so they must stack one above the other. The central spiral stair is compact, but leaves one side of the house without direct access to the landings, so there are bedrooms only accessible through another bedroom - in the worst case, through two other bedrooms. The drawbacks of this arrangement are again a legacy of Fowler's influence, an unwillingness to sacrifice spaciousness in the rooms to sensible circulation arrangements. Fowler's own house had external staircases and the verandas were used for circulation and access to the rooms.

Record drawings
Below are drawings of the Watertown Octagon House dated March 28, 1935, prepared by the Historic American Buildings Survey. At that time the verandas were missing, removed when they became dangerously rotten. The survey drawings are a reconstruction of the house as it was originally built.

See also

List of octagon houses
List of octagonal buildings and structures

References

Further reading
 Baker, John Milnes. American House Styles: A Concise Guide. NY: W. W. Norton & Company, 2002.
 Puerzer, Ellen L. The Octagon House Inventory. Eight-Square Publishing, 2011.
 Rempel, John I.Building with Wood. Toronto: University of Toronto Press, 1967.
 Schmidt, Carl F. The Octagon Fad. 1958.
 Schmidt, Carl F. and Philip Parr. More About Octagons. 1978.
 Goncalves, Eliseu. The Octagon in the Houses of Orson Fowler. Nexus Journal, vol 13, nº 2. Basel: Springer/Birkhauser, 2011.
 Fowler, Orson S. with a new Introduction by Madeleine B. Stern. "The Octagon House: A Home For All" Dover Publications, 1973.

External links

Northeast Journal: Fowler's Folly, Fishkill, NY
Octagon House Inventory, by Robert Kline, a retired engineer living in Grand Rapids, MI
Oldhouseweb: Octagon House: 1850-1860
Buffalo Architecture and History: Octagon House Style
Woodchester Museum (Ontario): Octagonal houses in Canada
Ontario Architecture: Ontario Octagon Movement
The Octagon in the Houses of Orson Fowler

House styles
 
American architectural styles
Architecture related to utopias